Ainsley Denzil Dubriel Harriott  (born 28 February 1957) is an English chef and television presenter. He is known for his BBC cooking game shows Can't Cook, Won't Cook and Ready Steady Cook.

Early life 
Harriott was born in Paddington, London, to Peppy (née Strudwick) and pianist and singer, Chester Leroy Harriott (1933–2013). He has Jamaican heritage. Harriott attended Wandsworth Comprehensive School then trained at Westminster Kingsway College (formerly Westminster Technical College), and obtained an apprenticeship at Verrey's restaurant in London's West End, later working as a commis chef.

Career 
Harriott's talents lie in comedy and singing as well as cooking. He formed the Calypso Twins with school friend Paul Boross, releasing a hit record in the early 1990s, "World Party". The Calypso Twins were regular performers at the Comedy Store and Jongleurs; they also performed in America and on TV and radio shows. Harriott became head chef at the Long Room of Lord's Cricket Ground. He was asked to present More Nosh, Less Dosh on BBC Radio 5 Live, and also has appeared as an extra in Hale and Pace.

Television work 

Harriott became the resident chef on Good Morning with Anne and Nick and later the main presenter of Can't Cook, Won't Cook and  Ready Steady Cook, both shows involving members of the public. He has presented more straightforward how-to-cook programmes such as Ainsley's Barbecue Bible, Ainsley's Meals in Minutes, Ainsley's Big Cook Out and Ainsley's Gourmet Express.

Harriott played the part of a GELF chief in the sci-fi comedy series Red Dwarf in 1993. In 1998, for the show's 10th anniversary, Harriott presented a special edition of Can't Cook, Won't Cook called Can't Smeg, Won't Smeg with the cast of the show cooking a meal while remaining in character.

In 2000, Harriott made his debut on US television with The Ainsley Harriott Show, syndicated by Buena Vista Television, which ran for more than 100 episodes. Following this he went on to host Ready.. Set... Cook!, the US version of Ready Steady Cook. Ainsley was guest chef on Something for the Weekend on 10 May 2009 and 21 February 2010 alongside guests JLS. In February 2010, Harriott joined the morning show GMTV with Lorraine featuring cookery recipes. From 2002 until 2007, Harriott appeared in TV adverts for Fairy Liquid.

In September 2008, Harriott took part in the genealogy documentary series Who Do You Think You Are?. Harriott knew that his great-grandfather Ebenezer Harriott was in the colonial West India Regiment, and had assumed that they were descended from slaves. In Barbados, he confirmed that his great-grandfather had a distinguished military career, and learnt that he had fought on the side of the British in the Hut Tax War of 1898 – an increasingly violent series of protests against systems of taxation in Sierra Leone. Although Harriott had assumed that his great-great-grandfather, James Gordon Harriott, was a black slave, he was revealed to be the descendant of a long line of white slaveowners.

Harriott appeared in the final My Family Christmas special in 2010 "Mary Christmas". On 11 August 2015, he was announced as the second contestant of the thirteenth series of Strictly Come Dancing. On 5 September 2015 it was revealed Harriott was paired with professional dancer Natalie Lowe for the thirteenth series. He was the fourth contestant to be voted off and finished twelfth.

Harriott was appointed Member of the Order of the British Empire (MBE) in the 2020 New Year Honours for services to broadcasting and the culinary arts.

Writing 

Harriott is a best-selling author, publishing twelve books as well as numerous others in conjunction with his television shows. Including foreign-language translations, he has sold over 2 million books worldwide.

Other work 
Harriott was the President of the Television and Radio Industries Club (TRIC) 2004–05 and presented their awards ceremony that year. He markets his own range of food, including couscous, risotto, soups and cereal bars.

Harriott played the role of the Narrator in The Rocky Horror Show at the New Theatre, Cardiff in March 2010, at the Churchill Theatre, Bromley in October 2010, and again at the Richmond Theatre in November 2010.

He made a guest appearance in the BBC radio comedy series Giles Wemmbley Hogg Goes Off as himself in 2006.

On 23 May 2022 Harriot saved his elder sister Jacqueline from drowning, after she fell head-first into a narrow water feature in the BBC Studios exhibition garden, at the Chelsea Flower Show. She was dragged to safety by a group of people including DIY SOS presenter Nick Knowles.

Personal life 
Harriott married former costume designer Clare Fellows, the youngest sister of comedian and actor Graham Fellows. They have two children. In November 2012, the couple were reported to have separated and they remain on good terms.

Harriott is a supporter of Arsenal F.C.

Filmography

Bibliography 
 1999 Ainsley Harriott's Meals In Minutes
 2000 Ainsley Harriott's Barbecue Bible
 2002 Ainsley Harriott's Low-fat Meals In Minutes
 2002 Ainsley Harriott's Gourmet Express
 2003 Ainsley Harriott's All New Meals In Minutes
 2003 Ainsley Harriott's Gourmet Express 2
 2003 The Top 100 Recipes from Ready Steady Cook
 2004 Ainsley Harriott's Friends and Family Cookbook
 2005 Ainsley's Ultimate Barbecue Bible
 2006 Ainsley Harriott's All New Meals In Minutes
 2006 Ainsley Harriott's Feel Good Cookbook
 2008 Ainsley Harriott's Fresh and Fabulous Meals in Minutes
2009 Just Five Ingredients
 2011 My Kitchen Table: 100 Meals in Minutes
2012 My Kitchen Table: 100 Great Chicken Recipes
2019 Ainsley's Caribbean Kitchen
2020 Ainsley’s Mediterranean Cookbook
2021 Ainsley’s Good Mood Food

References

External links 
 Official website 
 

1957 births
Living people
Black British television personalities
English chefs
English game show hosts
English people of Jamaican descent
English television chefs
English television presenters
English writers
Internet memes
Members of the Order of the British Empire
People from Paddington
Television people from London